Marley is a scattered hamlet in the civil parish of Kingston, in the county of Kent, England.

Before and after the Norman Conquest, it was also home to the family seat of the Wootton family.

Hamlets in Kent
City of Canterbury